Ulidia omani is a species of ulidiid or picture-winged fly in the genus Ulidia of the family Ulidiidae.

References

Ulidia